The National Association of GSA Networks is a nationwide federation of state-level gay–straight alliance networks. It was created in 2005 through Gay–Straight Alliance Network (GSA Network), a California non-profit organization that organizes gay–straight alliances in public and private schools in the state.

Member GSA networks
 Center for Artistic Revolution (Arkansas)
 Alabama Safe Schools Coalition c/o Equality Alabama
 Wingspan (Arizona)
 GSA Network
 Colorado Gay–Straight Alliance Network and One Colorado
 True Colors (Connecticut)
 Florida Gay Straight Alliance Network c/o Equality Florida
 Georgia Safe Schools Coalition
 Supporting and Mentoring Youth Advocates and Leaders (SMYAL) (District of Columbia)
 Illinois GSA Network and Illinois Safe Schools Alliance
 Indiana Youth Group
 Iowa Pride Network
 Louisville Youth Group (Kentucky)
 GLSEN Southern Maine
 Massachusetts GSA Network c/o Massachusetts Commission on GLBT Youth
 Out For Good (Minnesota)
 Mississippi Safe Schools Coalition
 Missouri GSA Network (Missouri) 
 HiTOPS (New Jersey)
 New Mexico GSA Network
 Long Island Gay and Lesbian Youth (New York)
 LGBT Center of Raleigh (North Carolina)
 Kaleidoscope Youth Center (Ohio)
 Oregon Safe Schools and Communities Coalition and Oregon Gay Straight Alliance Network
 Ally Safe Schools and Mazzoni Center (Pennsylvania)
 Youth Pride Rhode Island
 SC Equality (South Carolina)
 Eastern Tennessee GLSEN Chapter (Tennessee)
 Texas GSA Network
 Utah QSA Network
 Outright Vermont
 GLSEN Richmond (Virginia)
 Washington GSA Network and GLSEN Washington Chapter
 GSA For Safe Schools (Wisconsin)

Initiatives
Gay–Straight Alliance Network holds both a GSA Advocacy & Youth Leadership Academy (GAYLA) and Queer Youth Advocacy Day (QYAD) each year.

The National Association holds an annual National Gathering for GSAs and Safe school coalitions.

Website
 National Association of GSA Networks

LGBT youth organizations based in the United States